Francis Rowe may refer to:

 Francis Rowe (Cambridge cricketer) (1859–1897), English county cricketer
 Francis Rowe (Essex cricketer) (1864–1928), English county cricketer
 Francis Rowe (politician) (1860–1939), Australian politician
 Frank Rowe (public servant) (1895–1958), Australian public servant
 F. A. P. Rowe (born 1898), English barrister

See also
 Sir Francis Roe, Irish politician
 Francis Asbury Roe, admiral
 Frances M. A. Roe, army wife and memoirist